The English-American Building, commonly referenced as the  Flatiron Building,  is a building completed in 1897 located at 84 Peachtree Street NW in downtown Atlanta, Georgia, on the wedge-shaped block between Peachtree Street NE, Poplar Street NW, and Broad Street NW.  It was completed five years before New York's Flatiron Building, and shares a similar prominent flatiron shape as its counterpart.  It was designed by Bradford Gilbert, a Chicago school contemporary of Daniel Burnham, the designer of the New York building. The building has 11 stories, and is the city's second and oldest standing skyscraper. The Flatiron building is protected by the city as a historic building in the Fairlie-Poplar district of downtown, and is listed in the National Register of Historic Places.

Immediately across Peachtree is the historic Rhodes-Haverty Building, on the north corner with Williams Street.

FlatironCity is now home to a Microsoft Innovation Center, Women's Entrepreneurship Institute and 20+ entrepreneurs and startups.

In 2017, it was announced that a statue of Evander Holyfield would be installed in front of the building. However, the planned location for the statue has since been changed.

References

External links

 Atlanta, Georgia, a National Park Service Discover Our Shared Heritage Travel Itinerary
Several circa 1910 postcards of the Flatiron
Scoutmob co-founder eyes "Flatiron" building for incubator
T. Cobb Benning Photographs, 1897-1898 from the Digital Library of Georgia

Office buildings completed in 1897
Commercial buildings on the National Register of Historic Places in Georgia (U.S. state)
Skyscraper office buildings in Atlanta
City of Atlanta-designated historic sites
National Register of Historic Places in Atlanta
Chicago school architecture in Georgia (U.S. state)
Flatiron buildings